Saint-Laurent is a church in the 10th arrondissement of Paris (119, rue du Faubourg-Saint-Martin, 68, boulevard de Strasbourg or 68, boulevard de Magenta). It is built on Paris's north–south axis, linking Senlis and Orléans, as laid out by the Romans in the course of the mid 1st century BC, now marked by the rue du Faubourg-Saint-Martin, rue Saint-Martin, rue Saint-Jacques and rue du Faubourg-Saint-Jacques). It has been listed since 2016 as a monument historique by the French Ministry of Culture.

Gallery

References

Laurent
Monuments historiques of Paris